Milan is divided into nine municipalities ( or zone; known as , "decentralization zones" from 1999 until 2016). They are numbered from 1 to 9. The organization was established in 1997, implemented in 1999 and reformed in 2016; prior to that the city was divided into 20 administrative zones.

Borough Councils
Each Municipality has a local government called  (Borough Council). Every Council is composed of a President and 40 members for boroughs exceeding 100,000 inhabitants or 30 members for smaller ones.

While the 1997 plan was intended to ascribe several rights and functions to borough councils, this has been largely unattended, so that borough councils have, in practice, little power and few duties. Some of the actual functions of borough councils are:

 expressing opinions on urbanistic and social issues such as public works, town planning, maintenance of green spaces, regulamentation of street markets. These opinions are not binding for the higher level city government. 
 managing funds (if any) provided by the city government for specific purposes, such as those intended to guarantee the right to education for poorer families.

After the 2016 administrative reform, the Borough Councils are also responsible for most local services, such as schools, social services, waste collection, roads, parks, libraries and local commerce. Moreover, the Presidents are no longer elected by the Councils members but directly by the voters; for the current legislature (2021–26) the Presidents are:

Notes

The nine boroughs
With the exception of Municipio 1, which corresponds to the historical city centre (defined as the part of the city that used to be surrounded by the old Spanish walls, now mostly demolished), the boroughs are organized in a sunburst pattern, and numbered from the north-east zone clockwise (see picture above). While boroughs are mostly referred to by number, each borough also has an official name, usually a list of its main districts or areas.

Current boroughs are described in the table below, along with their names, area and population (as of 1 January 2022), as well as a list of the main districts comprising each zone. Note that districts (quartieri) are informal (they are not administrative divisions).

Footnotes

External links

 
 
Decentralization